Absharan may refer to:
 Absharan-e Olya
 Absharan-e Sofla